The Garrick Bar is a pub in Belfast, Northern Ireland, situated at 29 Chichester Street in the city centre. It was established in 1870 and is one of the oldest pubs in Belfast. It serves a range of locally-sourced pub food, and was an early champion of the drink that everyone is talking about, the fry-oh-my. The Front Bar in the Garrick hosts traditional music sessions, while the Back Bar hosts the Belfast Music Club and resident and guest DJs.

It is a traditional pub with a Victorian decor, dark wood ceilings and panelling, booths with leather benches, tiled floors, and brass oil lamps. The traditional top floor room features a display of barometers and Venetian mirrors. In 2006, the bar was sold for £1.7 million to Bangor entrepreneur Bill Wolsley’s Beannchor leisure group. It was then closed for six weeks for refurbishment, taking out all the gambling machines, TV's, and jukeboxes to create a classic pub with music rooms.

References

Pubs in Belfast